The Pathya Vat is a Cambodian verse form, consisting of four lines of four syllables each, where lines two and three rhyme.  When a poem consists more than one stanza, the last line of the previous stanza rhymes with the second and third lines of the following one.

The form is traditionally recited or sung in many different styles, including:
  (temple boy)
  (description)
  (grief)
  (reciting)
  (anger)
  (traditional code)
  (crow hops)
  (crow calls)

References
Vernick, Harris "Cole". The Baker's Dozen: The Cole Foundation Collection, Volume 1. AuthorHouse, 2007.  p252
Guide to Verse Forms: Pathya Vat
Cambodian Religion and Music

Poetic forms
Cambodian culture